Pashkeh (also known as Pashgeh) is a village in Belesbeneh Rural District, Kuchesfahan District, Rasht County, Gilan Province, Iran. At the 2006 census, its population was 654, in 199 families.

References 

Populated places in Rasht County